Jacek Michal Gałązka (28 April 1924 – 8 May 2018) was a soldier of the Polish Armed Forces in the West, publicist and émigré activist. He served as President of the Józef Piłsudski Institute of America from 1999 until 2008.

Biography
Gałązka was born in April 1924 in Wilno, Poland (now Vilnus, Lithuania). He served in the Cadets Corps in Rawicz, and from 1942 was a soldier of the Second Motorized Regiment in the First Armored Division of the Polish Armed Forces in the West.

He studied economics at the University of Edinburgh in Scotland and moved to the United States in 1952. There he founded Polish Heritage Publications and became a publisher of Polish literature in the English language.

Gałązka worked for Charles Scribner's Sons, eventually advancing to become its President. He also translated the works of Stanisław Jerzy Lec, including Unkempt Thoughts, and co-authored the Polish Heritage Travel Guide to USA & Canada. He served as President of the Józef Piłsudski Institute of America from 1999 to 2008.

He died in Cornwall, New York in May 2018 at the age of 94.

Bibliography
 Biogram Jacka Gałązki na stronie Instytutu Józefa Piłsudskiego w Ameryce

References

1924 births
2018 deaths
Military personnel from Vilnius
Polish military personnel of World War II
Individuals associated with the Józef Piłsudski Institute of America
Polish emigrants to the United States
Polish expatriates in the United Kingdom